was a Japanese waka poet of the mid-Heian period. One of his poems was included in the Ogura Hyakunin Isshu, and thirty-one of his poems were included in imperial anthologies from the Goshūi Wakashū on.

Biography 
Although his exact birth and death dates are unknown, he flourished around 998 to 1064.

A Tendai monk at Hiei-zan, he later became  of the Gion Monastery.

Poetry 
Thirty-one of his poems were included in imperial anthologies from the Goshūi Wakashū on.

The following poem by him was included as No. 70 in Fujiwara no Teika's Ogura Hyakunin Isshu:

References

Bibliography 
 
McMillan, Peter. 2010 (1st ed. 2008). One Hundred Poets, One Poem Each. New York: Columbia University Press.
Suzuki Hideo, Yamaguchi Shin'ichi, Yoda Yasushi. 2009 (1st ed. 1997). Genshoku: Ogura Hyakunin Isshu. Tokyo: Bun'eidō.

External links 
List of Egyō's poems in the International Research Center for Japanese Studies's online waka database.
Egyō-hōshi-shū in the same database.
Egyō on Kotobank.

11th century in Japan
11th-century Japanese poets
People of Heian-period Japan
Japanese Buddhist clergy
Articles containing Japanese poems
Hyakunin Isshu poets
Heian period Buddhist clergy